Steiff is a German-based plush toy company. It was founded in 1880 by Margarete Steiff, a seamstress. The toys began as elephants, and were originally a design Steiff found in a magazine and sold as pincushions to her customers. However, children began playing with them, and in the years following she went on to design many other animal-themed toys for children, such as dogs, cats and pigs. She designed and made most of the prototypes herself.

Steiff's nephew Richard joined in 1897 and gave the company an enormous boost by creating stuffed animals from drawings made at the zoo. A 3000 piece order was placed in 1903 by a buyer in America after the "Teddy" bear craze began showing a cartoon with President Roosevelt and a young cub.  By 1907, Steiff manufactured 974,000 bears, and has been increasing its output ever since.

Description

The Steiff company motto, as styled by Margarete Steiff, is "Only the best is good enough for children". Steiff products are subject to meticulous testing and inspection. They are required to be highly flame resistant and, among other things, smaller pieces such as eyes must be able to resist considerable tension, wear and tear, etc.

The most common materials used in Steiff toys are alpaca, felt, mohair, and woven plush. Eyes are generally made of wood or glass, and the stuffing is commonly wood shavings or polyester fibers. A large amount of the work is done by hand, from design sketches to airbrushed paint. The final touch on any Steiff toy is the trademark "button in ear" (assuming the animal has one; in any case they will find a spot for it).

The iconic "button in ear" tag was devised by Margarete's nephew Franz in 1904, to keep counterfeits from being passed off as authentic Steiff toys. It is made of metal. The tag originally had the symbol of an elephant, which was later replaced by the name "Steiff". The button is still used to distinguish Steiff toys from fakes. Some special toys have both the elephant and the name.

References

External links
 Steiff Website in English
 Steiff Website
 Steiff Company, US-branch
 BBC News: "Teddy bear celebrates 100th birthday"
 The Steiff factory building in Giengen: Glass-icon of modernism. In: Goethe-Institut online, Architecture, September 2014

Companies based in Baden-Württemberg
Toy companies of Germany
Teddy bear manufacturers
Toy companies established in the 19th century
Manufacturing companies established in 1880
German companies established in 1880